Ophisurus macrorhynchos is an eel in the family Ophichthidae (worm/snake eels). It was described by Pieter Bleeker in 1853. It is a marine, temperate water-dwelling eel which is known from the Indo-Western Pacific and Atlantic Ocean.

O. macrorhynchos is of commercial interest to fisheries.

References

Ophichthidae
Fish described in 1853